Richard Conway Casey (January 19, 1933 – March 22, 2007) was a United States district judge of the United States District Court for the Southern District of New York. Casey gained national prominence for his unusual personal circumstances — during his years on the bench, he was completely blind — and for his aggressive questioning during a 2004 trial considering the constitutionality of the Partial-Birth Abortion Ban Act of 2003. He died on March 22, 2007.

Early life
Casey was born January 19, 1933, in Ithaca, New York. He received a Bachelor of Science degree from the College of the Holy Cross in 1955, and a Bachelor of Laws from Georgetown University Law Center in 1958. At Georgetown, Casey was particularly influenced by prominent lawyer Edward Bennett Williams.

After law school, Casey worked as a legal investigator for the New York County District Attorney's office before becoming an Assistant United States Attorney for the Southern District of New York (1959–1963). From 1963 to 1964, he served as counsel for the Special Commission of the State of New York where he helped prosecute public corruption cases. From 1964 until his nomination in 1997, Casey worked in private practice with the New York City law firm of Brown & Wood.

He was in the Naval Reserve Officers Training Corps while at College of Holy Cross. He then joined the United States Army (1958 and 1961-1962) and the New York Army National Guard (1958–61). He went to basic training at Fort Dix, New Jersey as a private and then served in the New York National Guard at the 142nd Tank Battalion in Freeport, New York.

Federal judicial service
Casey was a United States District Judge of the United States District Court for the Southern District of New York. Casey was nominated by President Bill Clinton on July 16, 1997, to a seat vacated by Charles S. Haight, Jr. He was confirmed by the United States Senate on October 21, 1997, and received commission on October 24, 1997. Casey's service was terminated on March 22, 2007, due to death.

Blindness
In 1964, Casey was diagnosed with retinitis pigmentosa. His condition deteriorated into total blindness in 1987. His blindness does not seem to have slowed his career or personal ambition. At his Senate confirmation hearing, Casey expressed confidence in his ability to effectively judge the credibility of witnesses despite his loss of sight. He used a guide dog in court, and he was assisted by computers that read documents aloud.

A Catholic, Casey initially struggled with his blindness and was inspired by a pilgrimage to the Sanctuary of Our Lady of Lourdes. In 1999, Casey travelled to Rome to meet Pope John Paul II and accept the Blessed Hyacinth Cormier, O.P., Medal for "outstanding leadership in the promotion of Gospel Values in the field of justice and ethics".

Notable cases
Casey sentenced Gambino crime family boss Peter Gotti to 25 years in prison on July 28, 2005, seven months after a federal jury found Gotti guilty of conspiring to murder government informant and former Gambino underboss Sammy Gravano. Gotti had earlier been convicted by United States District Court for the Eastern District of New York judge Frederic Block for money laundering and racketeering.

NAF v. Ashcroft
Casey presided over one of the three constitutional challenges to the 2003 Partial-Birth Abortion Ban Act, National Abortion Federation v. Ashcroft. A coalition led by NAF argued that the statute was unconstitutional under the Supreme Court's 2000 decision in Stenberg v. Carhart because the Act explicitly excluded a "health exception". The Bush administration argued that the courts should defer to a congressional finding of fact that this particular abortion procedure is never medically necessary to protect the health of a mother.

Casey had granted a temporary restraining order prohibiting enforcement of the Act on November 6, 2003, the day after it was signed into law. The trial began on March 29, 2004, and lasted 16 days.

Casey made headlines throughout the trial by his aggressive questioning. He repeatedly asked witnesses—mostly doctors who perform abortions—about the possibility that fetuses feel pain during abortion, and whether patients are truly informed of that possibility. For example, the following is from an exchange during the redirect examination of Dr. Timothy Johnson:

On August 26, 2004, Casey entered a judgment declaring the Partial-Birth Abortion Ban Act unconstitutional, in deference to Supreme Court precedent, but also condemning the procedure as "gruesome, brutal, barbaric and uncivilized".

The Bush administration appealed to the Second Circuit Court of Appeals, which affirmed the judgment. In a related case, Gonzales v. Carhart, the Supreme Court reversed a similar Eighth Circuit Court of Appeals decision and upheld the federal Partial-Birth Abortion Ban Act as constitutional, at least on a facial challenge.

See also
List of first minority male lawyers and judges in the United States
List of first minority male lawyers and judges in New York

References

External links

1933 births
2007 deaths
20th-century American judges
21st-century American judges
American prosecutors
Assistant United States Attorneys
American blind people
College of the Holy Cross alumni
Georgetown University Law Center alumni
Judges of the United States District Court for the Southern District of New York
People from Ithaca, New York
New York National Guard personnel
United States Navy midshipmen
United States Army soldiers
United States district court judges appointed by Bill Clinton